Since the office was established in 1789, 45 persons have served as president of the United States. Of these, 14 (around ) are known to have been Freemasons, beginning with the nation's first president, George Washington, and most recently the 38th president, Gerald R. Ford.

List 
The following U.S. presidents were Freemasons:

In addition to the individuals listed above, Lyndon B. Johnson was initiated into the first degree of Freemasonry"Entered Apprentice", October 30, 1937, in Johnson City Lodge No. 561, at Johnson City, Texas, but did not advance any further and did not become a full member of his lodge, Ronald Reagan was made an honorary Freemason, and as a youth, Bill Clinton was a member of the Order of DeMolay. Also, there is speculation suggesting that Thomas Jefferson was a Freemason; however, there is no record of him being initiated into any lodge, nor are there any references to Masonic membership in his personal papers.

Gallery

See also 
 List of monarchs who were Freemasons

Notes

References

External links 
 The Role of Freemasons in Presidential Funerals, YouTube, 2018 presentation by author Louis Picone at the Chancellor Robert R Livingston Masonic Library of the Grand Lodge of New York

Freemasons
United States presidents